Irène Assiba d'Almeida is a Beninese poet, translator and literary scholar. She is Professor of Francophone Studies and French at the University of Arizona.

Life
Irène Assiba d'Almeida was born in Dakar, Senegal to Dahomeyan parents. She was educated in Benin before gaining a BA from the University of Amiens in France, an M.Phil from the University of Ibadan in Nigeria. She  received her PhD in 1987 from Emory University in the United States. She collaborated with Olga Mahougbe to translate Chinua Achebe's novel Arrow of God into French.

D'Almeida's first book, Francophone African women writers, was welcomed as "quite an event for African, Women's and Francophone Studies". She was the convener of the 2010 African Literature Association Conference, which was held at the University of Arizona. The contributions were published as Eco-imagination: African and diasporan literatures and sustainability (2013).Professor Irène Assiba d'Almeida

Works
 Francophone African women writers: destroying the emptiness of silence. Gainesville: University Press of Florida, 1994.
 (ed.) A rain of words: a bilingual anthology of women's poetry in Francophone Africa. Charlottesville: University of Virginia Press, 2009. Translated by Janis A. Mayes.
 (ed. with John Conteh-Morgan) "The original explosion that created worlds": essays on Werewere Liking's art and writings. Amsterdam; New York: Rodopi, 2010.
 (ed. with Lucie Viakinnou-Brinson and Thelma Pinto) Eco-imagination: African and diasporan literatures and sustainability. Trenton, New Jersey: Africa World Press, 2013.
 (ed. with Sonia Lee) Essais et documentaires des Africaines francophones: un autre regard sur l'Afrique. Paris: L'Harmattan, 2015.
 (with Elsie Augustave) Autour de "L'enfant noir" de Camara Laye: un monde à découvrir. Paris: l'Harmattan, 2018.

References

Year of birth missing (living people)
Living people
Beninese poets
Beninese translators
Beninese academics
Beninese emigrants to the United States
University of Arizona faculty
Literary scholars
Scholars of African literature
Beninese women poets
20th-century poets
20th-century women writers
20th-century non-fiction writers
21st-century poets
21st-century women writers
21st-century non-fiction writers
Women non-fiction writers
20th-century translators
21st-century translators
Emory University alumni
University of Ibadan alumni
People from Dakar
20th-century Beninese writers
21st-century Beninese writers